Shi De Yang, born Shi Wanfeng (史万峰; Taikang, 1968) is a Chinese Buddhist priest said to be the 31st Grand Master of the fighting monks (wǔsēng 武僧) of the Shaolin Monastery.  Shi De Yang is globally considered one of the greatest present exponents of traditional Shaolin culture.

Biography
Shi Wanfeng was born in Taikang County. He was disciple of Shi Suxi for almost 30 years, studying the "Three Shaolin Treasures” : Chan (religion), Wu (martial arts) and Yi (traditional medicine). In August 1991 he began to work as the head coach of the Shaolin Warrior Monks.

De Yang is currently the vice president of the Association of study of Shaolin Kung Fu in China and assessor of the International Shaolin Kung Fu & Wushu Federation. He is headmaster of Shaolin Temple International Wushu Institute registered by the Henan Province and Zhengzhou City governments in Dengfeng in 1980. He is also one of the instructors at Dengfeng Wuseng Houbeidui (Shàolínsì Wǔsēng Hòubèiduì 少林寺武僧后备队) in China and the Europe Branch Shaolin Cultural Center in Italy and Switzerland. He is involved in transmitting traditional Shaolin kung fu around the world. Countries that he has visited include Italy, England, Hungary, Argentina, Uruguay, Mexico, and Canada. Several schools around the world have affiliated to the Shaolin Temple.

Early life

Shi De Yang was born in a town called Taikang, at the Henan province in China. As a child he was influenced by his neighbor who used to be a Shaolin Monk, the stories of the elder at the temple introduced him to the Shaolin Kung Fu. Despite De Yang's family negative he got admitted at the Shaolin Temple.

Martial Arts Career

He studied kung fu under Shi Su Xi,

References

External links
Shi De Yang website
Shaolin Temple website

1968 births
Living people
People's Republic of China Buddhists
Chinese martial artists
People from Taikang County
Shaolin Temple